Stoddert may refer to:

People 
 Benjamin Stoddert (1751–1813), United States Secretary of the Navy
 John Truman Stoddert (1790–1870), American politician

Places 
 Fort Stoddert
 Stoddert, Virginia

Other uses 
 USS Benjamin Stoddert, armed destroyer in the United States Navy